The Phascogalini are a tribe in the family Dasyuridae, comprising seven genera of small marsupials native to Australia and New Guinea.

Classification 
 Tribe Phascogalini
 Genus Antechinus
 Tropical antechinus, Antechinus adustus
 Agile antechinus, Antechinus agilis
 Fawn antechinus, Antechinus bellus
 Yellow-footed antechinus, Antechinus flaviceps
 Atherton antechinus, Antechinus godmani
 Cinnamon antechinus, Antechinus leo
 Swamp antechinus, Antechinus minimus
 Brown antechinus, Antechinus stuartii
 Subtropical antechinus, Antechinus subtropicus
 Dusky antechinus, Antechinus swainsonii
 Genus Murexia
 Short-furred dasyure, Murexia longicaudata
 Long-nosed dasyure,  Murexia naso
 Black-tailed dasyure, Murexia melanurus
 Habbema dasyure, Murexia habbema
 Broad-striped dasyure, Murexia rothschildi
 Genus Phascogale
 Red-tailed phascogale, Phascogale calura
 Brush-tailed phascogale, Phascogale tapoatafa
 Northern brush-tailed phascogale Phascogale pirata

References

Dasyuromorphs
Mammal tribes